Danso is a surname. Notable people with the surname include:

Surname:
Benjamin Danso (born 1984), German rugby union player
Erixon Danso (born 1989), Ghanaian-Dutch footballer
Kevin Danso (born 1998), Austrian footballer
Kwaku Danso (born 1982), American football player
Mamadou Danso (born 1983), Gambian footballer
Megan Danso (born 1990), Canadian actress
Mustapha Danso (born 1981), Gambian constable, soldier
Richard Danso (born 2000), Ghanaian footballer
Yaw Danso (born 1989), Ghanaian footballer

Given name:
 Kweku Danso-Boadi (born 1980) Canadian Businessman and CFO

Surnames of Akan origin